Manuel Cros Grau (1 September 1901 - 1 February 1986) was a Spanish footballer who played as a center-forward for CE Europa and Espanyol. In the 1920s, he was one of the great idols of Catalan football, alongside the likes of Zamora and Samitier. His haircut (brush style) was known in the barbershops of the time as "cutting the hair like Cros’s".

Club career
Born in Calanda, he moved to Catalonia from an early age and always considered himself Catalan. After playing for FC Internacional, CE Júpiter and later for FC Martinenc, he was signed by CE Europa in 1922. Together with Mauricio, Pellicer and Alcázar, he was part of the great attacking front of the CE Europa side that won the Catalan Championship in 1923 after beating Barcelona 1-0 in a play-off title-decider. Cros then played a pivotal role in helping Europa reach their first-ever Copa del Rey final in 1923, where they were beaten by Athletic Bilbao 0-1, courtesy of a goal from Travieso. Nevertheless, Barcelona made him a sensational offer: 50,000 pesetas, when his salary was 500 plus bonus per goal scored, but he refused and stayed with Europa. He played in the first-ever season of La Liga in 1929, being Europa's star man during the only three seasons that the club spent at the top flight.

On 7 October 1928, in a Catalan championship match between Europa and RCD Espanyol, he opened the scoring with a goal past Ricardo Zamora. However, the referee of the game, Agustín Cruella Tena, controversially disallowed his goal after Zamora protested that there was a hole in the side-netting through which the ball had went in. This incident is known in Spain as "the first ghost goal".

In 1931 he left the club in a tribute match between Europa and Barcelona, and in that same year, at the age of 30, he joined FC Martinenc as a player-coach, where he remained until 1933. After short spells at Espanyol, CE Sabadell and Tàrrega SC, he retired as a player, but during the Spanish Civil War, due to the lack of players to make up the squad, he rejoined Espanyol where he played his last season as a footballer in the 1937-38 season.

International career
Cros played several matches for the Catalan national team, including the one against Bolton on 20 May 1929 on the occasion of the inauguration of the Estadi Olímpic Lluís Companys, which had been built for the 1929 Expo in Barcelona, and surprisingly, the Catalan team won by a score of 4-0.

Managerial career
After he retired he coached several modest clubs such as CE Manresa (1941-42), UE Sant Andreu (1946-47) or CD Atlético Baleares (1948-49).

Legacy
Cros was a pure center-forward by the standard of the time: A physical wonder of enormous power who was called the Tiger, a relentless auctioneer “with the charge of a buffalo”. Although he is a historic player who has been forgotten over the years, Cros, even a hundred years after his debut, must be considered the best footballer who has worn the Europa shirt.

Honours

Club
CE Europa
Catalan championship:
Champions (1): 1922–23

Copa del Rey:
Runner-up (1): 1923

References

1901 births
1986 deaths
Sportspeople from the Province of Teruel
Footballers from Aragon
Spanish footballers
Association football forwards
CE Júpiter players
FC Martinenc players
CE Europa footballers
RCD Espanyol footballers
CE Sabadell FC footballers
Catalonia international footballers
Spanish football managers